Khalanga may refer to several places in Nepal:

Khalanga, Baitadi
Khalanga, Dadeldhura
Khalanga, Dailekh
Khalanga, Darchula
Khalanga, Jajarkot
Khalanga, Salyan